Unnecessary Mountain, also called Mount Unnecessary, is a peak in the North Shore Mountains near Vancouver, British Columbia, Canada and a popular hiking destination.  It is accessible via the Howe Sound Crest Trail and a direct route from Lions Bay.

The mountain is so named because of an "unnecessary" ascent over this mountain to reach The Lions.

In December 2014, a rockslide killed 7-year-old Erin Kate Moore as she was hiking with a group on Unnecessary Mountain.

A second peak, also named Unnecessary Mountain, is located in Alberta northwest of the town of Pincher Creek.

References

One-thousanders of British Columbia
North Shore Mountains